Stuart Lee (born 11 February 1953) is an English former football forward. Lee was born in Manchester, and played professionally in England, Wales and the United States.

Player
In 1971, Lee began his professional career when he signed with Bolton Wanderers. He was seventeen at the time. He spent three season in the second and third Division of the Football League with Bolton before transferring to third division Wrexham At the time, Wrexham experienced considerable success in both the FA Cup and European competitions. In 1976, they went to the quarterfinals of the Cup Winners Cup where Lee scored the team's lone goal in a 2–1 aggregate loss to R.S.C. Anderlecht. He spent two seasons with Wrexham before moving to Stockport County in 1978. He spent only one season with Stockport before moving to the first division with Manchester City. However, he played only six league games before being sold to the Portland Timbers of the North American Soccer League. He spent three seasons with the Timbers. During that time, he played three outdoor seasons and two indoor seasons. The Timbers folded at the end of the 1982 season and Lee signed with the Kansas City Comets of the Major Indoor Soccer League. In 1982, he returned to outdoor soccer with the Carolina Lightnin' of the second division American Soccer League. By this time, outdoor soccer was collapsing in the United States and the ASL ceased operations following the 1983 season. Lee signed with the Los Angeles Lazers of the MISL in the fall of 1983. He would play two seasons for the Lazers. He returned to the NASL for the 1984 season, playing for the Tampa Bay Rowdies, but the league collapsed at the end of the season. Lee would remain with the indoor game for the remainder of his career. On 6 September 1985, the St. Louis Steamers signed Lee. After one season, he moved to the Kansas City Comets then back to the Lazers. Lee signed as a free agent with the Dallas Sidekicks on 20 October 1987. He spent one season with the Sidekicks, then retired from playing professionally.

Coach
Following his retirement as a player, Lee returned to England, where he became a manager in the Stockport County reserves. He would return to Portland during the summers to run youth soccer camps. On 29 November 1989, the Seattle Storm of the American Professional Soccer League hired Lee to replace Tommy Jenkins as head coach. The Storm folded at the end of the 1990 season. In December 1993, he bought the team from Bud Greer and entered it in the amateur Pacific Coast League. Lee is currently coaching at Crossfire in Seattle.

References

Lee is now a coach for Eastside FC.

External links
NASL stats
Dallas Sidekicks player profile
Seattle Storm coaching profile

1947 births
Living people
Footballers from Manchester
American soccer chairmen and investors
American Soccer League (1933–1983) players
American Professional Soccer League coaches
Bolton Wanderers F.C. players
Carolina Lightnin' players
Dallas Sidekicks (original MISL) players
English footballers
English expatriate footballers
Kansas City Comets (original MISL) players
Los Angeles Lazers players
Manchester City F.C. players
Major Indoor Soccer League (1978–1992) players
North American Soccer League (1968–1984) indoor players
North American Soccer League (1968–1984) players
Portland Timbers (1975–1982) players
St. Louis Steamers (original MISL) players
Stockport County F.C. players
Tampa Bay Rowdies (1975–1993) players
Wrexham A.F.C. players
Association football forwards
English expatriate sportspeople in the United States
Expatriate soccer players in the United States
English football managers
Seattle Storm (soccer) coaches